A by-election was held for the Kedah State Assembly seat of Bukit Selambau on 7 April 2009 following the nomination day on 30 March 2009. The by-election was held on the same day as the Batang Ai state seat by-election and the Bukit Gantang federal seat by-election.

Background 

The seat was vacated after the incumbent assemblyman and State EXCO, V. Arumugam resigned of both his positions on 9 February 2009. Arumugam was an assemblyman from the Parti Keadilan Rakyat (PKR), a component party of Pakatan Rakyat. He won the seat, then as an independent, by a majority of 2,362 votes against Barisan Nasional (BN) candidate, S. Krishnan in the 2008 general elections. He later joined PKR after his victory, and were the party's state deputy chairman and Merbok PKR deputy chief at the time of his resignation as an MLA. Arumugam has alleged that his resignation were the result of harassment towards him and his family to leave PKR by BN, an allegation that were refuted by BN.

Candidates 

S. Manikumar of PKR has been nominated as Pakatan Rakyat candidate in the by-election. BN, which forms the opposition in the Kedah Assembly, named S. Ganesan from MIC as their candidate. 13 other independent candidates were registered on nomination day, making this election one on the most number of candidates contesting, and at the time the record for a state seat election (15).

Results 
The by-election was won by Manikumar from PKR with a majority of 2,403 votes.

References 

Politics of Kedah
2009 elections in Malaysia
2019 Bukit Selambau by-election
Elections in Kedah